Dolnje Prapreče (in older sources also Dolenje Prapreče) is a small settlement west of Šentlovrenc in the Municipality of Trebnje in eastern Slovenia. The area is part of the historical region of Lower Carniola. The municipality is now included in the Southeast Slovenia Statistical Region.

A section of the Roman road from Emona to Siscia and Roman graves were found at a site near the settlement.

References

External links
Dolnje Prapreče at Geopedia

Populated places in the Municipality of Trebnje